...In Your Eyes is Mary MacGregor's second album.

Track listing 
Side one

Side two

Personnel
Fred O. Tackett, Jay Graydon, Ben Benay, Thom Rotella, Lee Ritenour, Doug MacLeod - guitar
Tabatt Laven - banjo
Michael J. Porcaro, Leland Sklar, Bobby Bartone, Reinhold O. Press - bass
John J. Barnes, Jr., Artie Butler, Michael A. Lang, David W. Foster, Harold T.J. Smith - keyboards
Jim Gordon, Edward Greene, Jeffrey T. Porcaro, Wilbert Dugas - drums
Victor S. Feldman, Alan C. Estes, Joe Griglia - percussion
Stephanie Spruill, Alexandra Brown, Ann White - backing vocals
Bud E. Shank - saxophone on "Just the Way You Are"
Bill Peterson, Marion "Buddy" Childers, Dick Hyde, Ernie Carlson, Ernie Watts, Gale Robinson, Gene Cipriano, Jerry Hey, Jim Atkinson, John Ellis, Dick Noel, Robert Yeager, Sheridon Stokes, Steve Madaio - horns
Allan Harshman, Armand Kaproff, Arni Egilsson, Arnold Belnick, Bernard Kundell, Daniel Shindaryov, David Montagu, David Schwartz, Debbie Grossman, Dennis Karmazyn, Harold J. Dicterow, Harris Goldman, Harry Shlutz, Henry Ferber, Henry Roth, Herschel Wise, Ilkka Talvi, Isabelle Daskoff, Israel Baker, Jack Gootkin, James Getzoff, Jay Rosen, Jerome Kessler, Jesse Ehrlich, Joy Lyle, Linn Subotnick, Mark Kovacs, Marvin Limonick, Michael Nowak, Murray Adler, Myra Kestenbaum, Nathan Ross, Pamela Goldsmith, Peter Mercurio, Ray Kelley, Reinhold Press, Richard Kaufman, Ronald Folsom, Samuel Boghossian, Shari Zippert, Sidney Sharp, Tibor Zelig, William Kurasch - strings
Technical
Armin Steiner - engineer

External links

Mary MacGregor albums
1978 albums
Albums produced by Tom Catalano
Albums arranged by Lee Holdridge
Ariola Records albums